Kappa Arietis, Latinized from κ Arietis, is the Bayer designation for a binary star in the northern constellation of Aries. The combined apparent visual magnitude of the pair is 5.02, making the system bright enough for it to be dimly visible to the naked eye as a white-hued point of light. It is located approximately 181 light-years from the Sun based on parallax, and is drifting further away with a radial velocity of +11.5 km/s.

The binary nature of this system was announced in 1918 by Lick Observatory. It is a double-lined spectroscopic binary with an orbital period of 15.3 days and an eccentricity of 0.61. Both components displaying the spectral properties of an Am, or metallic-lined star. They have nearly the same brightness and their mass ratio is 1.03; very close to equal.

References

External links
Aladin previewer
Aladin sky atlas
 HR 613

A-type main-sequence stars
Am stars
Spectroscopic binaries

Arietis, Kappa
Aries (constellation)
Durchmusterung objects
Arietis, 12
012869
009836
0613